The action of 9 January 1921 was a short naval battle fought during the Russian Civil War by the French Navy and the Soviet Russia.

Background 
During the Russian Civil War, the French Navy was engaged as part of the Allied Intervention provided assistance to the White faction engaged into the Southern Front. The French Navy suffered a mutiny in 1919 but operations were carried until the end of the conflict.

Action 
The action involved the Arabe-class destroyers Sakalave and Sénégalais intercepting on sea the Soviet Russian multi-purpose ship Elpidifor No415 (also rated as gunboat) on minelaying duties. After a short gunfire battle, the Soviet vessel was hit, grounded and lost with the seventy casualties close Anapa.

Aftermath 
Wreck of Elpidifor No415 was scrapped in situ in 1922, but some wreckages can still be found.

References

External links

Allied intervention in the Russian Civil War
Battles of the Russian Civil War
Naval battles involving Russia
Naval battles involving France
Naval battles of the Russian Civil War